Good Humor-Breyers (Ice Cream USA) is the American ice cream division of Unilever and includes the formerly independent Good Humor, Breyers, Klondike, Popsicle, Dickie Dee and Sealtest brands. Based in Englewood Cliffs, New Jersey it was formed in 1993 after Unilever purchased the ice cream division of Kraft General Foods.

History 
Unilever began making Good Humor ice cream products in the United States in 1961. In 1992, Unilever acquired Dickie Dee, a Canadian ice cream vending company that sold product from ice cream trucks and tricycle carts. At the time of the sale, there were around 1,500 tricycles in 300 cities. Unilever ended the ice cream bikes in the early 2000s and carts were sold to distributors.  

In 1993, Unilever announced it would acquire the Breyers and Sealtest brands from Kraft who however retained the name use for non-ice cream products.

Unilever integrated its ice cream division into its main offices in Englewood Cliffs, New Jersey in 2007.

Good Humor-Breyers products
The Good Humor brand has been known for its ice cream trucks; Good Humor brand creator Harry Burt was also the first to create the concept of an ice cream truck.  Good Humor-Breyers products have included:
 Breyers ice cream
 Choco Taco
 Klondike bar
 Popsicle

References

Unilever companies